Georgina Elizabeth Anne Roberts (born 9 July 1984 in Bradford, West Yorkshire) is a member of the England women's rugby union squad. Roberts was educated at Beckfoot School, and started playing rugby at the University of Bath after she missed a flight to a skeleton bobsleigh competition in the Netherlands at the age of 19. Her main squad is the Darlington Mowden Park Sharks, her position is centre, her height is 1.62 m, she is 61 kg and has seven caps.

Her nickname is Toad.

References

1985 births
Living people
England women's international rugby union players
English female rugby union players
Female rugby union players
Rugby union players from Bradford